Mon oncle Benjamin (My Uncle Benjamin) is a 1969 French film directed by Édouard Molinaro, starring Jacques Brel and Claude Jade. The film is based on a once-popular French comic novel  by Claude Tillier (1842). The 1969 film Don't Grieve, directed by the Georgian Georgi Daneliya, is also based on Tillier's novel as was Francis Bousquet's 1942 comic opera Mon oncle Benjamin.  The film was released on 28 November 1969.

Plot 
The story is set in 1750 during the time of Louis XV. Benjamin (Jacques Brel) is a country doctor in love with the beautiful innkeeper's daughter, Manette (Claude Jade), but she refuses his advances until he produces a marriage contract. After suffering a humiliating practical joke and condemned to prison, Benjamin escapes with Manette, who realizes she prefers happiness to a marriage contract after all.

Cast 
 Jacques Brel – Benjamin Rathery
 Claude Jade – Manette
 Bernard Alane – Pont-Cassé
 Robert Dalban – Innkeeper
 Bernard Blier – Marquis
 Rosy Varte – Bettine
 Paul Frankeur – Minxit
 Lyne Chardonnet – Arabelle
 Armand Mestral – Machecourt
 Paul Préboist – Parlenta
 Daniela Surina – Marquise of Cambyse

References

External links 

Picture Jacques Brel and Claude Jade

Jacques Brel
1969 films
1969 romantic comedy films
Films based on French novels
French romantic comedy films
Films directed by Édouard Molinaro
Films set in the 1750s
Films set in France
Fiction set in 1750
1960s French films